The 2017 World Archery Championships was the 49th edition of the event. It was held in Mexico City, Mexico from 15 to 22 October 2017 and was organised by World Archery Federation (formerly known as FITA). Qualification and elimination rounds took place at the Campo Marte. The competition was preceded by the World Archery Federation Congress on 13–14 October.

The programme featured was the same as previous World Championships, with individual, team, and mixed team events in the compound and recurve disciplines.

Schedule
All times are local (UTC+01:00).

Medals table

Medals summary

Recurve

Compound

Participating nations
At the close of registrations, a 58 nations had registered 373 athletes. Nations in bold sent the maximum number of participants, with a full team in each event.

  (7)
  (7)
  (6)
  (7)
  (4)
  (7)
  (10)
  (4)
  (6)
  (12)
  (12)
  (3)
  (6)
  (4)
  (5)
  (12)
  (3)
  (1)
  (6)
  (3)
  (3)
  (12)
  (3)
  (3)
  (12)
  (7)
  (2)
  (6)
  (12)
  (12)
  (8)
  (6)
  (12)
  (1)
  (6)
  (2)
  (12)
  (12) (host) 
  (2)
  (9)
  (1)
  (5)
  (4)
  (7)
  (1)
  (2)
  (2)
  (12)
  (3)
  (1)
  (6)
  (6)
  (10)
  (5)
  (12)
  (6)
  (11)
  (12)

References

External links
 Championships details
 Championships results

 
World Championship
World Archery
International archery competitions hosted by Mexico
2017
Sports competitions in Mexico City
October 2017 sports events in Mexico